Zhje or Zhe with descender (Җ җ; italics: Җ җ) is a letter of the Cyrillic script. Its form is derived from the Cyrillic letter Zhe (Ж ж Ж ж) with an addition of a descender on its right leg.

Zhje is used in the alphabets of the Dungan, Kalmyk, Tatar and Turkmen languages.

Zhje corresponds to the digraphs  or  used in other Cyrillic alphabets, or to the letters Che with descender (Ҷ ҷ), Che with vertical stroke (Ҹ ҹ), Dzhe (Џ џ), Khakassian Che (Ӌ ӌ), Zhe with breve (Ӂ ӂ), or Zhe with diaeresis (Ӝ ӝ).

Computing codes

See also
Cyrillic characters in Unicode

References

Tatar language